Thihathu was a Burmese royal title, and may refer to:

Kings
 Thihathu: Co-Founder of Myinsaing Kingdom (r. 1297–1310) and founder of Pinya Kingdom (r. 1310–25)
 Thihathu of Ava: King of Ava (r. 1421–25), aka Viceroy Thihathu II of Prome (r. 1416–19)
 Narapati I of Ava: King of (r. 1442–68), aka Viceroy Thihathu III of Prome (r. 1429–42)
 Thihathura I of Ava: King of Ava (r. 1468–80)
 Thihathura II of Ava: Joint-King of Ava (r. 1485–1501)
 Minye Thihathu I of Toungoo: Viceroy of Toungoo (r. 1540–49)
 Minye Thihathu II of Toungoo: King of Toungoo (r. 1597–1609), Viceroy of Toungoo (r. 1584–97)

Royalty
 Thihathu of Pagan: Son of King Uzana, half-brother of King Narathihapate
 Thihathu I of Prome: Viceroy of Prome (1278–88)

Burmese royal titles